Moulton Seas End is a village in the civil parish of The Moultons and the South Holland district of Lincolnshire, England. Moulton Seas End population is included in The Moultons.

The civil parish includes the primary parish village of Moulton, and the villages of Moulton Chapel and Moulton Eaugate.

In 1885 Moulton Seas End (then just 'Seasend' or 'Seaend') was a hamlet. A school existed in which there was a chapel for worship, constructed by subscription in 1868. By 1933 occupations, in what was now a village, included twenty-three farmers, three cottage farmers, five smallholders, a potato merchant, a fruit grower, a butcher, a blacksmith, a higgler—itinerant pedlar—two carpenters, two shopkeepers one of whom ran the post office, and the landlord of the Golden Lion public house.

The Golden Lion public house still exists and there is also a village hall and playing fields. The population of the village is about 850. The village war memorial commemorates twenty-two men killed in the First World War, and three in the Second.

References

External links 

"Moulton", Genuki.org.uk, includes Moulton Seas End. Retrieved 30 June 2014

Villages in Lincolnshire
South Holland, Lincolnshire